Krech is a surname. Notable people with the surname include:

David Krech (1909–1977), Polish born American experimental and social psychologist
Franz Krech, German commander of the 41st Infantry Division during World War II
Roman Krech (born 1989), Kazakhstani speed skater
Rüdiger Krech (born 1964), German public health doctor
Warren William Krech (1894–1948), American actor

See also 
 Grech